Cheryl Chow (May 24, 1946 – March 29, 2013) was an American educator and politician.

Early life
Chow was born in Seattle, Washington on May 24, 1946. Chow's father was Edward Shui "Ping" Chow (November 5, 1916 - June 29, 2011), who received U.S. Citizenship after he was discharged from United States Army. Chow's mother was Ruby Chow, who served as a King County Councilwoman, the first Asian American elected to that council.

Chow's maternal grandparents were Chinese immigrants who had come to the United States to work on the railroad lines.

Chow's parents were also restaurant owners of the famous Ruby Chow's restaurant, where Bruce Lee once worked.

Chow graduated from Franklin High School and then attended Western Washington University.

Career
Chow was a teacher at Hamilton International Middle School, a public school in the Seattle School District. Chow was a principal of Sharples Junior High School (now Aki Kurose Middle School Academy).

Besides being a teacher and principal, Chow also coached girls' basketball for the city parks and recreation department.

From 199097, she served on the Seattle City Council. Chow also served on the Seattle School Board and was president of the school board.

After 1997, Chow was a principal of her alma mater Franklin High School and of Garfield High School.

In 2005, Chow was elected to the Seattle School Board during a time where the district saw increasing school closures and instability.

Personal

Chow came out as lesbian in August 2012. On March 16, 2013, less than two weeks before her death, Chow married her partner, Sarah Morningstar. Together, they have a daughter, Liliana Morningstar-Chow.

Death
Cheryl Chow died of central nervous system lymphoma, aged 66, in Seattle, Washington and was survived by her wife, Sarah Morningstar, and several brothers and half-brothers.

References 

1946 births
2013 deaths
Seattle City Council members
School board members in Washington (state)
Women in Washington (state) politics
American LGBT city council members
LGBT people from Washington (state)
American LGBT people of Asian descent
Lesbian politicians
American politicians of Chinese descent
Asian-American people in Washington (state) politics
Deaths from lymphoma
Deaths from cancer in Washington (state)
Schoolteachers from Washington (state)
American women educators
Western Washington University alumni
American women of Chinese descent in politics
Women city councillors in Washington (state)
Asian-American city council members
Franklin High School (Seattle) alumni
21st-century American LGBT people
21st-century American women